is a Japanese retired competitive figure skater. She is the 1988 World Junior bronze medalist and the 1988 Japanese national bronze medalist.

Results

References

1971 births
Japanese female single skaters
Living people
World Junior Figure Skating Championships medalists
Sportspeople from Kobe